The following are the football (soccer) events of the year 1914 throughout the world.

Events
The only edition of the Vienna Cup, the first European cup competition, is won by the Glentoran of Northern Ireland.
Woolwich Arsenal are renamed Arsenal.
Palmeiras is founded as SS Palestra Italia.
PFC Levski Sofia is founded on May 24.
Portuguese Football Federation is founded, as Portuguese Football Union, on 31 March.
Reggina Calcio is founded.

Winners club national championship
Argentina: Racing Club, Estudiantiles Porteño
Austria: Wiener AF
Belgium: Daring CB
Denmark: Kjøbenhavns Boldklub
England: Blackburn Rovers
France: Olympique Lillois
Germany: SpVgg Fürth
Hungary: MTK Hungária FC
Iceland: Fram
Italy: Casale
Netherlands: H.V.V.
Paraguay: Olimpia
Scotland: For fuller coverage, see 1913-14 in Scottish football.
Scottish Division One – Celtic
Scottish Division Two – Cowdenbeath
Scottish Cup – Celtic
Sweden: AIK
United States: The oldest club trophy soccer competition in the Americas, Lamar Hunt U.S. Open Cup, is founded as National Challenge Cup and the Brooklyn Field Club (1898-1924) are the first champions.
Uruguay: CA River Plate
Greece: 1913 to 1921 - no championship titles due to the First World War and the Greco-Turkish War of 1919-1922.

International tournaments
1914 British Home Championship (January 19, 1914 – April 4, 1914)

Births
 June 10 – Hans Klodt, German international footballer (died 1996)
 July 16 – August Lešnik, Croatian footballer (died 1992)
 July 18 – Oscar Heisserer, French international (died 2004)
 August 26 – Atilio García, Argentine-Uruguayan footballer (died 1973)
 November 23 – Tom Storey, English professional footballer (died ?)
 December 18 – František Fadrhonc, Czech football manager (died 1981)

Deaths
April 19 - Morton Betts, English footballer and cricketer

References

 
Association football by year